Anthia duodecimguttata is a species of ground beetle in the subfamily Anthiinae. It was described by Bonelli in 1813.

References

Anthiinae (beetle)
Beetles described in 1813